Ctenosaura oaxacana, commonly known as the Oaxacan spiny-tailed iguana, is a species of lizard in the family Iguanidae. It is endemic to Mexico.

Geographic range
It is found in the Mexican state of Oaxaca.

Habitat
Its natural habitat is subtropical or tropical dry forests.

Conservation status
It is threatened by habitat loss.

Sources

Further reading
 Köhler, G. and C.R. Hasbún. 2001. A new species of spiny-tailed iguana from Mexico formerly referred to Ctenosaura quinquecarinata (Gray 1842) (Reptilia: Sauria: Squamata). Senckenbergiana Biologica 82: 235–241. [and/or "(Reptilia, Squamata, Iguanidae). Senckenbergiana biologica 81: 257-267".]

Ctenosaura
Endemic reptiles of Mexico
Natural history of Oaxaca
Critically endangered biota of Mexico
Critically endangered fauna of North America
Reptiles described in 2001
Taxa named by Gunther Köhler
Taxonomy articles created by Polbot